Audrey Marguerite Coombs (married name Jones), (1928-2016), was a female Welsh international table tennis player.

Table tennis career
She won a bronze medal in the 1951 World Table Tennis Championships in the Corbillon Cup (women's team event) with Audrey Bates and Betty Gray for Wales.

Personal life
She married Garfield 'Gron' Jones in 1951.

See also
 List of table tennis players
 List of World Table Tennis Championships medalists

References

Welsh female table tennis players
Sportspeople from Neath
1928 births
2016 deaths
World Table Tennis Championships medalists